The 1965 Western Australian state election was held on 20 February 1965.

Retiring Members

Labor

 George Bennetts (MLC) (South-East)
 John Teahan (MLC) (North-East)

LCL

 Reg Mattiske (MLC) (Metropolitan)
 James Murray (MLC) (South-West)

Country

 Anthony Loton (MLC) (South)

Legislative Assembly
Sitting members are shown in bold text. Successful candidates are highlighted in the relevant colour. Where there is possible confusion, an asterisk (*) is also used.

Legislative Council
Sitting members are shown in bold text. Successful candidates are highlighted in the relevant colour. Where there is possible confusion, an asterisk (*) is also used.

See also
 Members of the Western Australian Legislative Assembly, 1962–1965
 Members of the Western Australian Legislative Assembly, 1965–1968
 Members of the Western Australian Legislative Council, 1962–1965
 Members of the Western Australian Legislative Council, 1965–1968
 1965 Western Australian state election

References
 

Candidates for Western Australian state elections